The Astral Sleep is the second studio album from Tiamat. It marks their debut on longtime label, Century Media Records. This album was reissued in 2006 with two tracks from A Winter Shadow single, released in 1990.

Musically, this album blends the death metal style of Tiamat's debut album with gothic metal elements. Lyrically, this album features a mixture of Satanism with introspective and esoteric themes.

Track listing 

Note
Bonus tracks are taken from the "A Winter Shadow" EP (1990 CBR Records)
In the lyric sheet track 4 is titled "Dead Boys' Choir" and track 10 - "I Am the King (...of Dreams)"

Personnel
Johan Edlund – vocals, keyboards, & rhythm guitar
Thomas Petersson – lead guitar & acoustic guitar
Jörgen Thullberg – bass guitar
Niklas Ekstrand – drums

All keyboards on this album by Jonas Malmsten.
Additional guitar solo on "Ancient Entity" by Waldemar Sorychta.

References

Astral Sleep, The
Tiamat (band) albums
Albums with cover art by Kristian Wåhlin
Albums produced by Waldemar Sorychta